The Silver Falcons is the aerobatic display team of the South African Air Force. Based at Air Force Base Langebaanweg near Cape Town, the Silver Falcons fly the Pilatus PC-7 Mk II, the basic trainer of the SA Air Force in a 5-ship routine. The main purpose of the Silver Falcons is to enhance the image of the South African Air Force, encourage recruitment and instill national pride through public display.

History

Originally formed in 1953 as the Bumbling Bees and flying the T-6 Harvard and then the de Havilland Vampire. The Bumbling Bees flew a 4 ship formation and made a name for themselves by regularly taking part in South African airshows. The team disbanded in the late 1950s leaving a gap in South African aviation.

During 1966 the Aermacchi MB-326 "Impala" arrived and the Bumbling Bees were reinstated under the command of Colonel Chris Prins. The Silver Falcons were based at Air Force Base Langebaanweg on the West Coast of South Africa, near Cape Town. The team went from strength to strength and the idea to change the name to a more bilingual-sounding name came about. The Silver Falcons ("Die Silwer Valke" in Afrikaans) team was founded and gave their first display in November 1967 at the opening of the Atlas Aircraft Corporation.

During 1986, under the command of Commandant Dave Knoesen, the team was expanded to a 5 ship to bring about more exciting display postures and to include a solo display. The aircraft were also painted in orange, white and blue to represent the then current South African flag.

The Silver Falcons operated from Langebaanweg until the early 1990s, when all the Impala training was moved to Air Force Base Hoedspruit, in the Lowveld region of South Africa, and formed part of 85 Combat Flying School. During 1994 with a new national flag, the aircraft were repainted to represent the colours of the SA Air Force:  blue, light blue and white.

The Silver Falcons continued to operate from Hoedspruit until in 1998, the Silver Falcons moved to AFB Langebaanweg and commenced training in the Pilatus Astra. The decision was partly made due to the shortage of flying instructors at 85 CFS and also to display the new turbo-prop trainer to the nation. During this move, the team was once again reduced to a 4 ship. For nine years, the team flew in the standard red and white paint scheme of the Astra fleet.

In 2008, 6 of the Astras were repainted in a unique blue and white livery and the team was expanded to a 5-ship again. Paint for the respray was donated by a local paint supplier, First African Paints. The first display in the new livery was flown at the Africa Aerospace and Defense Expo at AFB Ysterplaat in September 2008.

Aircraft

The Pilatus PC-7 Mk II is a high performance single-engine turboprop aircraft, used by the South African Air Force for ab-initio training. It is powered by a 750 shp limited to 700 Pratt & Whitney PT6A-25C engine and is designed for G-loadings between +7 and −3.5 G, making it ideal for aerobatics. The aircraft has a tandem seat configuration with Martin Baker CH-11A ejection seats.

For all practical purposes the PC-7 Mk II can be seen as a hybrid between the PC-7 and the newer PC-9. Both these aircraft types are popular as military trainers and are in service with more than 30 air forces. Like the PC-9, the PC-7 Mk II features a larger cockpit, upgraded airframe and instruments and is fitted with a ventral airbrake, but it retains the smaller engine of the original PC-7.

Specifications
 Wing span — 10.19 m
 Length — 10.13 m
 Max Operating Speed — 300 knots (555 km/h)
 Maximum Mach Number — Mach 0.6
 Maximum Operating Altitude — 25 000 ft (7 622 m)
 Stalling Speed (Clean) — 75 knots (139 km/h)
 Stalling Speed (Landing Configuration) — 65 knots (120 km/h)
 Minimum Speed For Ground Level Ejection — 65 knots (120 km/h)

Accidents and incidents
16 April 1988 – Capt Kobus Griesel ejected from an Aermacchi MB-326 Impala after his engine caught fire during a display at Franschhoek.
2 October 1993 — During an airshow at Lanseria Airport, Falcon 5 crashed during a low-level solo display sequence. Capt Charlie Rudnick ejected moments after structural failure caused the right wing of his Impala Mk I to separate from the fuselage, but was killed on impact.

Current team
The team consists of 5 display pilots, 3 support officers and 12 ground crew members. Falcon 1 is the formation leader, with Falcons 2–5 being the wingmen.
All the team's pilots are serving instructors at the Central Flying School.

Team 67
August 2008 – September 2008
September 2008 – October 2008
Falcon 1: Maj Scott Ternent
Falcon 2: Capt Guy du Sautoy
Falcon 3: Maj Alex Macphail
Falcon 4: Capt D Deeflets
Falcon 5: Maj Nico Frylinck

Team 68
September 2008 – October 2008
Falcon 1: Maj Scott Ternent
Falcon 2: Capt Guy du Sautoy
Falcon 3: Capt Buti Tsebe
Falcon 4: Capt D Deeflets
Falcon 5: Maj Nico Frylinck

Team 69
October 2008 – December 2008
Falcon 1: Maj Scott Ternent
Falcon 2: Capt Roy Sproul
Falcon 3: Capt Buti Tsebe
Falcon 4: Capt D Deeflets
Falcon 5: Maj Nico Frylinck

Team 70
January 2009 – December 2010
Falcon 1: Maj Scott Ternent (Leader)
Falcon 2: Capt Roy Sproul
Falcon 3: Capt Buti Tsebe
Falcon 4: Capt Gerhard Lourens
Falcon 5: Maj Nico Frylinck (Soloist)
Ancillary Members:
Ground Liaison Officer: Capt Heybrech van Niekerk
Public Relations Officer: 2Lt Brian Goldschmidt

Team 71
March 2011 – December 2011
Falcon 1 – Capt Roy Sproul (Leader)
Falcon 2 – Capt Heybrech van Niekerk (first female member)
Falcon 3 – Capt Buti Tsebe
Falcon 4 – Capt Gerhard Lourens
Falcon 5 – Maj Beau Skarda (Soloist)

Team 72
December 2011 – May 2012
Falcon 1 – Maj Roy Sproul (Leader)
Falcon 2 – Capt Heybrech van Niekerk (first female member)
Falcon 3 – Lt Jacques Poolman
Falcon 4 – Capt Gerhard Lourens
Falcon 5 – Maj Beau Skarda (Soloist)

Team 73
Falcon 1 – Maj Roy Sproul (Leader)
Falcon 2 – Maj Werner Vermaak
Falcon 3 – Lt Jacques Poolman
Falcon 4 – Maj Heybrech van Niekerk (first female member)
Falcon 5 – Maj Beau Skarda (Soloist)
Ancillary Members:
Ground Liaison Officer: Capt Mark Gentles
Public Relations Officer: Lt Brian Goldschmidt

Team 74
Falcon 1 – Maj Roy Sproul (Leader)
Falcon 2 – Capt Mark Gentles
Falcon 3 – Lt Jacques Poolman
Falcon 4 – Maj Werner Vermaak
Falcon 5 – Maj Beau Skarda (Soloist)
Ancillary Members:
Ground Liaison Officer: Capt Loedolff Muller
Public Relations Officer: Lt Brian Goldschmidt

Team 75
Falcon 1 – Maj Beau Skarda (Leader)
Falcon 2 – Capt Mark Gentles
Falcon 3 – Capt Loedolff Muller
Falcon 4 – Maj Werner Vermaak
Falcon 5 – Capt Jacques Poolman (Soloist)
Ancillary Members:
Ground Liaison Officer: Still to be elected.
Public Relations Officer: Capt Christo Jansen

Team 76
Falcon 1 – Maj Beau Skarda (Leader)
Falcon 2 – Maj Marc Bennett
Falcon 3 – Maj Loedolff Muller
Falcon 4 – Maj Werner Vermaak
Falcon 5 – Maj Mark Gentles (Soloist)

Major Jacques Poolman (official reservist)

Team 77
Falcon 1 – Maj Werner Vermaak (Leader)
Falcon 2 – Maj Marc Bennett
Falcon 3 – Capt Jacques Poolman
Falcon 4 – Maj Loedolff Mûller
Falcon 5 – Maj Mark Gentles (Soloist)

Team 78
Falcon 1 – Maj Werner Vermaak (Leader)
Falcon 2 – Maj Marc Bennett
Falcon 3 – Maj Shaun Constable
Falcon 4 – Maj Loedolff Mûller
Falcon 5 – Maj Mark Gentles (Soloist)

Team 79
Falcon 1 – Maj Mark Gentles (Leader)
Falcon 2 – Maj James Wilcox
Falcon 3 – Capt Omphile Mutloane
Falcon 4 – Maj Marc Bennett
Falcon 5 – Maj Shaun Constable (Soloist)

Team 80
Falcon 1 – Maj Mark Gentles (Leader)
Falcon 2 – Maj James Wilcox
Falcon 3 – Major Sivuyile Tangana
Falcon 4 – Capt Wendy Badenhorst
Falcon 5 – Capt Omphile Mutloane (Soloist)

References
Silver Falcons Official website
Ejection-history.org.uk, Project Get out and Walk
Zero Error Margin: Airshow Display Flying Analysed by Maj Gen Desmond Barker

Notes

External links

Silver Falcons Official website
Silver Falcons Facebook Fan Page
Africa Aerospace & Defence Expo 2008
Silver Falcons Blog

South African Air Force
South African aerobatic teams
Military units and formations established in 1946